Tim Cavagin is a British sound engineer. He won an Academy Award and was nominated for one more in the category Best Sound for the films Baby Driver and Bohemian Rhapsody.

Selected filmography 
 Baby Driver (2017; co-nominated with Julian Slater and Mary H. Ellis)
 Bohemian Rhapsody (2018; co-won with Paul Massey and John Casali)

References

External links 

Living people
Place of birth missing (living people)
Year of birth missing (living people)
British audio engineers
20th-century British engineers
21st-century British engineers
Best Sound Mixing Academy Award winners
Best Sound BAFTA Award winners